Thomas Roberts Ferguson (December 1818 – September 15, 1879) was an Ontario businessman and political figure. He represented Cardwell in the Legislative Assembly of Ontario from 1867 to 1873 and Cardwell in the House of Commons of Canada as a Conservative member from 1867 to 1872.

His niece was women's rights activist Emily Murphy (née Ferguson), one of "The Famous Five".

Life and career
Thomas Roberts Ferguson was born in County Cavan, Ireland in 1818 and came to Canada with his family during the 1830s. They settled near Cookstown and he became a farmer and later a merchant there. He was a member of the Orange Order, becoming deputy grand master in 1858. Ferguson was a member of the council for Innisfil Township from 1852 to 1873, serving as reeve for 18 years. In 1858, he was elected to represent South Simcoe in the Legislative Assembly of the Province of Canada and served until Confederation. He supported representation by population. Ferguson also served as an officer in the local militia and became a lieutenant-colonel in 1865, participating in the defense against the Fenian raids. He was elected to both the Ontario legislature and the House of Commons (Cardwellin 1867 and was re-elected by acclamation to the provincial assembly in 1872. In the same year, he was struck on the head while attempting to stop a fight at a political meeting at Bradford and was forced to resign his seat in 1873 due to incapacity. He was appointed customs collector at Collingwood but was dismissed in 1876 after the Liberals came into power. He died at Cookstown in 1879.

References

External links

1818 births
1879 deaths
Politicians from County Cavan
Members of the Legislative Assembly of the Province of Canada from Canada West
Progressive Conservative Party of Ontario MPPs
Conservative Party of Canada (1867–1942) MPs
Members of the House of Commons of Canada from Ontario
Irish emigrants to pre-Confederation Ontario
Canadian people of Scottish descent
People of the Fenian raids
Immigrants to Upper Canada